This is a list of notable computer programs that are used for nucleic acids simulations.

See also

References 

Computational chemistry software
Software comparisons
Molecular dynamics software
Molecular modelling software